The Town of Kremmling is a Statutory Town in Grand County, Colorado, United States.  The town population was 1444 at the 2010 United States Census.  The town sits along the upper Colorado River in the lower arid section of Middle Park between Byers Canyon and Gore Canyon. The town was founded in 1881 during the Colorado Silver Boom days, but the lack of mineral resources in the nearby mountains made the town grow very slowly in the early days.

History
The settlement started with only a general store, run by a man named Rudolph "Kare" Kremmling, built on the north side of Muddy Creek. In 1881, two brothers, Aaron and John Kinsey, made part of their ranch into a town and called it Kinsey City. Kare moved his store across the river to the new site and soon people were calling this place Kremmling. The original post office was called Kinsey City and ran from 1881 to 1885, with Kare Kremmling the first postmaster. The name Kremmling was not officially recognized until 1895. After the Moffat railroad—the Denver, Northwestern & Pacific Railway—arrived in July 1906, Kremmling became the county's central shipping point. It was incorporated May 14, 1904. In the 20th century, ranching became the main industry in the valley in the vicinity of the town. In 1906, Kasper Schuler built the first brick building in town. The Schuler bottling works occupied the first floor, while the Schuler House, a boarding house run by Miss Kienholz, occupied the second. In 1933, the building became the Hotel Eastin.

Kremmling was featured in W. Eugene Smith's photographic essay "Country Doctor" in the September 20, 1948 issue of LIFE.

Geography
Kremmling is located at  (40.057240, -106.385896).

The town is located approximately at the mouth of both the Blue River, which descends from the south, and Muddy Creek, which descends from the north. This location provides valley access to Dillon, Colorado, and the ski resorts of Summit County, and Rabbit Ears Pass (renowned for world-class snowmobiling) at the Continental Divide, which then descends into Steamboat Springs.

Demographics

As of the census of 2010, there were 1,444 people in Kremmling.

As of the census of 2000, there were 1,578 people, 595 households, and 423 families residing in the town. The racial makeup of the town was 92.90% White, 0.06% African American, 0.25% Native American, 0.25% Asian, 0.13% Pacific Islander, 4.12% from other races, and 2.28% from two or more races. Hispanic or Latino of any race were 8.56% of the population.

There were 595 households, out of which 38.8% had children under the age of 18 living with them, 56.3% were married couples living together, 8.4% had a female householder with no husband present, and 28.9% were non-families. 24.4% of all households were made up of individuals, and 6.7% had someone living alone who was 65 years of age or older.  The average household size was 2.58 and the average family size was 3.07.

In the town, the population was spread out, with 29.0% under the age of 18, 8.4% from 18 to 24, 33.6% from 25 to 44, 20.8% from 45 to 64, and 8.1% who were 65 years of age or older.  The median age was 34 years. For every 100 females, there were 101.8 males.  For every 100 females age 18 and over, there were 109.0 males.

The median income for a household in the town was $45,605, and the median income for a family was $51,023. Males had a median income of $38,333 versus $25,385 for females. The per capita income for the town was $19,687.  About 8.2% of families and 8.1% of the population were below the poverty line, including 13.6% of those under age 18 and 1.6% of those age 65 or over.

Climate
This climate type is dominated by the winter season, a long, bitterly cold period with short, clear days, relatively little precipitation mostly in the form of snow, and low humidity.  According to the Köppen Climate Classification system, Kremmling has a subarctic climate, abbreviated "Dfc" on climate maps.

See also

Outline of Colorado
Index of Colorado-related articles
State of Colorado
Colorado cities and towns
Colorado municipalities
Colorado counties
Grand County, Colorado

References

External links

Town of Kremmling website
Kremmling Area Chamber of Commerce website
CDOT map of the Town of Kremmling

Towns in Grand County, Colorado
Towns in Colorado
Populated places established in 1881
1881 establishments in Colorado